St. Mary's Church Non-contiguous Historic District is a historic district near Hague, North Dakota, United States. The church was founded by immigrants who were Germans from Russia.

The district is composed of St. Mary's Church and the original St. Mary's cemetery, which is located at a separate site. It includes work from 1885 and work by Charles A. Hausler and Defort Schneider.  It was listed on the National Register of Historic Places in 1983 with two contributing buildings and a contributing site.

See also
Old St. Mary's Cemetery, Wrought-Iron Cross Site, also NRHP-listed

References

German-Russian culture in North Dakota
Churches on the National Register of Historic Places in North Dakota
Romanesque Revival church buildings in North Dakota
Roman Catholic churches completed in 1885
Historic districts on the National Register of Historic Places in North Dakota
Churches in the Roman Catholic Diocese of Bismarck
National Register of Historic Places in Emmons County, North Dakota
19th-century Roman Catholic church buildings in the United States